In Rubin v Botha, an important case in the South African law of lease, Botha purported to lease to Rubin and his partner a piece of land for a period of ten years. No money was to pass, but the purported lessee was to erect a dwelling house, a stable and a fowl-run, for which no compensation was to be claimable at the end of the lease.

The court held that Rubin was indeed a tenant, as the compensation for the use and occupation of the land was the fact that the parties intended that the buildings erected should become the property of the lessor at the expiration of ten years.

See also 
 South African law of lease

References 
 Rubin v Botha 1911 AD 568.

1911 in South African law
1911 in case law
Appellate Division (South Africa) cases
South African contract case law
South African property case law